Adrián Campos Suñer (17 June 1960 – 27 January 2021) was a Spanish Formula One driver. He participated in 21 Grands Prix, debuting on 12 April 1987, without scoring a championship point. He later moved into team management, with more success. He was the founder of the Campos Meta Formula One team (later known as HRT), which competed in Formula One from 2010 to 2012. He founded Campos Racing in 1998.

Racing career

Early years
Campos' first success was in radio-controlled car racing, winning the Spanish Championship in 1980. He switched to car racing a year later, and competed in Formula Three from 1983 to 1985, finishing 3rd in the 1985 German Championship. He raced in Formula 3000 in the 1986 season, with modest success.

Formula One
He only completed two of the 21 races he entered, although more of these were due to mechanical failures than driver errors. However, these retirements caused him to lose his motivation and in 1988, he was replaced by Pierluigi Martini after failing to qualify in three consecutive races.

After Formula One
Campos competed in Spanish Touring Cars, winning the championship in 1994. 1997 would be the last year Campos would spend as a professional driver. After some races in sports prototypes such as the Ferrari 333 SP, he would go on to form his own team as an owner.

Team management

After leaving Formula One, Campos was successfully involved in team management. He founded Adrian Campos Motorsport (later renamed Campos Racing) in 1998, with Marc Gené winning the 1998 Euro Open by Nissan championship in the championship's first year before immediately reaching Formula One. He also managed Fernando Alonso in his early years.

Campos Racing entered the GP2 series when it was launched for 2005. Two fifth places were the best results that year. The team opened 2006 with a podium at Valencia for Adrian Valles, but neither he nor fellow Spaniard Félix Porteiro scored another podium all year (Portiero was second on the road at Silverstone, but a steering rack irregularity caused him to be disqualified).

The signing of veteran Giorgio Pantano for 2007 led the team forward, with Pantano scoring two victories and 3rd overall, and teammate Vitaly Petrov winning at the season finale at Valencia. For 2008 Petrov remained, with Ben Hanley replaced in the second car by Lucas di Grassi after three rounds. Di Grassi immediately recaptured his 2007 form, with three second places in his first four starts, and subsequent wins at the Hungaroring and the new Valencia Street Circuit - which represented a double for the team, as Petrov won race one, having scored just one other podium all year. The Campos team won the 2008 Teams' Championship. In October 2008, Campos announced that he planned to step down from running the GP2 team and to sell his stake in it, but would still remain involved in F3 and a new project that was unspecified. The GP2 team was taken over by Alejandro Agag and renamed Barwa Addax.

Formula One
Campos had been linked to a move into Formula One, and he considered buying the assets of the defunct Super Aguri team. In May 2009, Campos Grand Prix lodged an entry for the 2010 Formula One season, which was one of four to be accepted. The entry was successful along with Lotus F1, Manor GP & US F1. The team, which was soon renamed to Campos Meta, confirmed on 30 October 2009 that Bruno Senna, who is Ayrton Senna's nephew, would be one of their drivers on the grid in 2010.

In February 2010, with the Campos team struggling financially, a rescue deal was completed whereby shareholder José Ramón Carabante took over full control of the team. As part of the restructuring, Campos was replaced as team principal by Colin Kolles. The team was renamed Hispania Racing (or HRT F1), with Campos taking the role of executive vice-president.

Personal life
His maternal grandfather Luis Suñer was a noted industrialist in Spain. His father founded the Avidesa frozen food company. He has a son whose name is also Adrián Campos Jr.

Campos died on 27 January 2021, aged 60, due to an aortic dissection.

Campos' home circuit of Circuit Ricardo Tormo has named its final turn after Campos.

Racing record

Complete International Formula 3000 results
(key) (Races in bold indicate pole position; races in italics indicate fastest lap.)

Complete Formula One results
(key)

24 Hours of Le Mans results

References

External links
 Profile on F1 Rejects
 Campos Meta site
 

1960 births
2021 deaths
Sportspeople from the Province of Valencia
Spanish racing drivers
Spanish Formula One drivers
Minardi Formula One drivers
24 Hours of Le Mans drivers
International Formula 3000 drivers
World Sportscar Championship drivers
Formula E people
Formula One team owners
People from Alzira, Valencia